"Linus and Lucy" is a popular instrumental jazz standard written by American jazz pianist Vince Guaraldi, appearing in many Peanuts animated specials. Named for the two fictional siblings Linus and Lucy van Pelt, it was originally released on Guaraldi's album Jazz Impressions of A Boy Named Charlie Brown. However, it gained its greatest exposure as part of the A Charlie Brown Christmas soundtrack the following year. It is one of the most recognizable pieces by Guaraldi, and has gained status as the signature melody of the Peanuts franchise.

Composition 

The genesis of "Linus and Lucy" began when Peanuts producer Lee Mendelson heard Guaraldi's recent hit, "Cast Your Fate to the Wind", on the radio while driving over the Golden Gate Bridge. Mendelson then contacted San Francisco Chronicle jazz critic Ralph J. Gleason, who put him in touch with Guaraldi. Mendelson believed Guaraldi would be a good fit for a documentary he was working on entitled A Boy Named Charlie Brown. Guaraldi gladly accepted the offer to compose several jazz tunes for the documentary.

Within several weeks, Mendelson received a call from an excited Guaraldi who wanted to play a piece of music he had just written. Mendelson, not wanting his first exposure to the new music to be marred by the poor audio qualities of a telephone, suggested coming over to Guaraldi's studio. Guaraldi enthusiastically refused, saying "I’ve got to play this for someone right now or I'll explode!" He then began playing the then untitled "Linus and Lucy" for Mendelson, who agreed the song was perfect for Schulz's Peanuts characters.

Reflecting on the song in 2008, Mendelson said, "it just blew me away. It was so right, and so perfect, for Charlie Brown and the other characters. I have no idea why, but I knew that song would affect my entire life. There was a sense, even before it was put to animation, that there was something very, very special about that music."

Releases
"Linus and Lucy" was originally featured on Jazz Impressions of A Boy Named Charlie Brown (1964) and was also released as the B-side for the single "Oh, Good Grief". However, it gained its greatest exposure as part of the Charlie Brown Christmas soundtrack the following year. Since then, it has been reissued multiple times. To date, it has been included on the following soundtracks and compilations:

A Charlie Brown Christmas (soundtrack) (1965)
Greatest Hits (1980)
Charlie Brown's Holiday Hits (1998)
The Definitive Vince Guaraldi (2009)
Peanuts Portraits (2010)
The Very Best of Vince Guaraldi (2012)
Peanuts Greatest Hits (2015)

Guaraldi included variations of his signature tune in most subsequent Peanuts television specials he worked on after A Charlie Brown Christmas through You're a Good Sport, Charlie Brown in 1975. Some of these alternate renditions have been made available on the following releases:
Oh Good Grief! (1968) – harpsichord-driven version
A Boy Named Charlie Brown: Selections from the Film Soundtrack (1970) – minor key, flute-driven versions
The Charlie Brown Suite & Other Favorites (2003) – band version from A Charlie Brown Thanksgiving and live version recorded at Mr. D's in San Francisco, California on May 18, 1969 
Vince Guaraldi and the Lost Cues from the Charlie Brown Television Specials, Volume 2 (2008) – chimes-driven version from You're Not Elected, Charlie Brown (1972)
 Live on the Air (2008) – live version recorded in 1974
An Afternoon with the Vince Guaraldi Quartet (2011) – live version recorded in 1967
A Boy Named Charlie Brown: Original Motion Picture Soundtrack (2017) – minor key, flute-driven versions
It's the Great Pumpkin, Charlie Brown: Music from the Soundtrack (2018) – flute-driven version

Legacy 
"Linus and Lucy" receives considerable airplay on radio stations in the United States and Canada that flip to Christmas music for the holiday season due to its inclusion on the soundtrack album of A Charlie Brown Christmas.

The first 24 bars of the song's sheet music were adopted as startup sound while a subsequent 8 bars were adopted as shutdown sound in the desktop theme Peanuts from Microsoft Plus! 98.

The song has been used as background music for The Weather Channel's local forecasts during the holiday season since 1999.

On May 10, 2019, the Recording Industry Association of America (RIAA) certified the single gold for sales.

Charts

See also
List of cover versions of Vince Guaraldi songs
List of jazz standards
Christmas music

References

Peanuts music
Jazz songs
Compositions by Vince Guaraldi
1960s jazz standards
Animated series theme songs
1960s instrumentals
1964 songs
American Christmas songs
Jazz compositions in A-flat major
Children's television theme songs
Compositions for piano
Fantasy Records singles